The Tattama are Hindu caste found in the state of Bihar in India.

Origin 

The Tattama are one of the traditional weaving Pan caste of south Bihar and Jharkhand. According to their traditions, they are descended from the tear of the Hindu god Shiva. They have three sub-divisions, the Kanaujiya, Maghaiya and Tirhutia. The community is found mainly in the districts of Darbhanga, Khagaria, Muzaffarpur, Begusarai, Saharsa, Madhepura Supaul, Purnia, Vaishali, Samastipur and Saran. They speak both Hindi and Maithili. The community are classified as scheduled caste The community consists of a number of exogamous clans.

The Tattama having given up weaving. The Tanti speak Panchpargania dialect of English Hindi. Many Tattama have emigrated to Punjab and Haryana, and work as agricultural labourers. Their traditions are similar to other Hindu weaving castes, such as the Koshta and Tanti.

References 

Indian castes
Social groups of Bihar
Weaving communities of South Asia
Social groups of Madhya Pradesh